Jane Gavalovski (born on 6 June 1980) is a Macedonian football manager and retired player.

Playing career
Born in Skopje, SR Macedonia, he started to play in the First League of FR Yugoslavia in 1998 with FK Rad where in five seasons made 50 matches scoring 5 goals. In January 2003, he moved to Super League Greece club PAS Giannina, but after they were relegated at the end of that season, he returned next January to FK Rad. In summer 2004 he moved to another Belgrade club, the 1997–98 Champions FK Obilić, but, after not getting many chances, decided to move to Romania to play in Universitatea Craiova. Since 2005, he played for the Serbian club FK Mačva Šabac where after retiring started the job as manager.

External links
 

1980 births
Living people
Footballers from Skopje
Association football forwards
Macedonian footballers
FK Mačva Šabac players
FK Rad players
PAS Giannina F.C. players
FK Obilić players
FC U Craiova 1948 players
First League of Serbia and Montenegro players
Football League (Greece) players
Liga I players
Macedonian expatriate footballers
Expatriate footballers in Serbia and Montenegro
Macedonian expatriate sportspeople in Serbia and Montenegro
Expatriate footballers in Greece
Macedonian expatriate sportspeople in Greece
Expatriate footballers in Romania
Macedonian expatriate sportspeople in Romania
Expatriate footballers in Serbia
Macedonian expatriate sportspeople in Serbia
Macedonian football managers
Expatriate football managers in Serbia